Madivala Machideva, also known as Veera Ganachari Madivala Machideva, was an Indian warrior of the 12th-century.

Airport

The Old Airport Road that connects Domlur and the old Bangalore airport was renamed as 'Madiwala Machideva Road' in his honour in September 2016.12th century great warrior and saint of LINGAYAT dharama, protected Vachanas of Basavanna

Movie
The Kannada film Machideva, starring Sai Kumar and Charulatha, is an action drama movie depicting Machideva and directed by Nanda Kameshwara Reddy.

See also
 Machideva Jayanthi
 Gadge Maharaj

References

Sources
 Colourful procession marks Madiwala Machideva Jayanti, The Hindu
 Vachana in "VACHANA" English Version Translation by: O.L. Nagabhushana Swamy, 2012, Pub: Basava Samithi, Basava Bhavana Benguluru 560001.
 Shivasharaneyaru, by: Shri Somashekhar Munavalli and Shri Siddhayya Puranik, 1994, Pub: Shree Basaveshwara Peetha, Karnataka University Dharwad-580003.
 Heaven of Equality, Transalted by: Dr. C. R.Yaravintelimath and Dr. M. M. Kalburgi, 2003, Pub: Shree Basaveshwara Peetha, Karnataka University Dharwad-580003

12th-century Indian people
Medieval Hindu religious leaders
Indian warriors
Lingayatism